is a Japanese modern pentathlete. He competed at the 1992 Summer Olympics.

References

External links
 

1964 births
Living people
Japanese male modern pentathletes
Olympic modern pentathletes of Japan
Modern pentathletes at the 1992 Summer Olympics
People from Kagoshima Prefecture
Modern pentathletes at the 1994 Asian Games
Asian Games competitors for Japan